Samuel "Bay" Taylor (January 27, 1929 – April 8, 2019) was an American catcher and left fielder who played in the Negro leagues. Listed at 5' 6" , 195 lb. , he batted and threw right handed.

Born in Charleston, Missouri, Taylor started his baseball career in East St. Louis, Illinois while playing for the local East St. Louis White Sox. He later played for several East St. Louis teams before joining the legendary Kansas City Monarchs of the Negro American League from 1952 through most of 1954 under manager Buck O'Neil. Afterwards, Taylor played with the Indianapolis Clowns late in 1954.

In an interview, Taylor explained that he patterned his playing style from his idol, Brooklyn Dodgers catcher Roy Campanella.

Unfortunately, there are not statistics for the Negro leagues in the post-integration era. Taylor enjoyed his best season when he hit a .325 batting average with 25 home runs and 51 RBI for a St. Louis team called the Midgets, according to his estimation.

In 2018, Taylor was invited to throw the ceremonial first pitch in a game of the St. Louis Cardinals at Busch Stadium.

Taylor died in 2019 in St. Louis, Missouri at the age of 90.

Sources

1929 births
2019 deaths
African-American baseball players
Baseball catchers
Baseball outfielders
Baseball players from Missouri
Indianapolis Clowns players
Kansas City Monarchs players
People from Charleston, Missouri
Sportspeople from St. Louis County, Missouri
20th-century African-American sportspeople
21st-century African-American people